The 1913 Washington State football team was an American football team that represented Washington State College during the 1913 college football season. The team competed as an independent under head coach John R. Bender, compiling a record of 4–4.

Schedule

References

Washington State
Washington State Cougars football seasons
Washington State football